In technical usage in the shipping industry, a pail is a type of cylindrical shipping container with a capacity of about . It can have straight or slanted sides and usually has a handle or bail.

The non-technical usage of pail is identical to bucket.

Construction
Pails can be made of
Steel, tinplate
Aluminium
 Fibre, paperboard
Plastics

Pails are either "open head" with removable lids (covers) or are "tight head" with sealed heads and a screw closure.

Pails made of wood, and later metal, were originally used to transport milk, before the introduction of the milk churn.

Uses
Pails are used for a variety of fluids and flowable materials. When properly constructed and certified, they may be used for dangerous goods shipments.

Pails are shipping containers that are shipped individually, shipped as secure unit loads on pallets, or shipped in corrugated fiberboard boxes.

See also
Bucket
Plastic bottle

References

Books, general references
 Soroka, W, Fundamentals of Packaging Technology, IoPP, 2002, 
 Yam, K. L., Encyclopedia of Packaging Technology, John Wiley & Sons, 2009, 
ASTM D4504—Specification for Molded Polyethylene Open-Head Pails for Industrial Shipping of Nonhazardous Goods

Containers